A War Story or War Stories or variation, may refer to:

Film
A War Story, a 1981 docudrama about Major Ben Wheeler in World War II
War Story (1989 film), a 1989 animated short film by Aardman Animations
 War Stories (2003 film), a TV movie with Jeff Goldblum
War Story (2014 film), a 2014 film featuring Catherine Keener and Ben Kingsley

Television
War Story (TV series), a Canadian documentary television series which premiered in 2012
 War Stories with Oliver North (TV series), a military history program on the U.S. Fox News Channel
 "War Stories" (Firefly), the tenth episode of science-fiction television series Firefly

Music
 War Stories (album), a 2007 electronic album by UNKLE
A War Story Book I, a 1999 album by Psycho Realm
A War Story Book II, a 2003 album by Psycho Realm

Comics
War Story (comics), a comic written by Garth Ennis
 War Stories (comics), comic book series from 2001
 Nambul: War Stories, a manhwa series of the military drama genre written by Hyun Se Lee
 The A-Team: War Stories, 2010 comic book miniseries

See also

 
 
 History of war
War (disambiguation) for stories named "War"
War song (disambiguation)
 War novel, genre of fiction
 War comic, genre of comics
 War film, genre of film